{ "type": "ExternalData", "service": "geoshape", "ids": "Q24189522", "properties": { "fill": "#0050d0"}}

Te Puaitaha / Breaksea Sound is a small fiord on the southwestern coast of South Island, New Zealand in the Tasman Sea. Breaksea Island in Fiordland National Park lies at its entrance. In the 1850s, early settlers Henry Hirst and John Watts-Russell explored the area for flat land suitable for sheep farming, but they were unsuccessful.
In October 2019, the name of the fiord was officially altered to Te Puaitaha / Breaksea Sound.

References

Fiords of New Zealand
Sounds of Fiordland